Kassel is an electoral constituency (German: Wahlkreis) represented in the Bundestag. It elects one member via first-past-the-post voting. Under the current constituency numbering system, it is designated as constituency 168. It is located in northern Hesse, comprising the city of Kassel and surrounding parts of the Landkreis Kassel district.

Kassel was created for the inaugural 1949 federal election. Since 2017, it has been represented by Timon Gremmels of the Social Democratic Party (SPD).

Geography
Kassel is located in northern Hesse. As of the 2021 federal election, it comprises the independent city of Kassel and the municipalities of Ahnatal, Espenau, Fuldabrück, Fuldatal, Helsa, Kaufungen, Lohfelden, Nieste, Niestetal, Söhrewald, and Vellmar from the Landkreis Kassel district.

History
Kassel was created in 1949. In the 1949 election, it was Hesse constituency 2 in the numbering system. From 1953 through 1976, it was number 127. From 1980 through 1998, it was number 125. In the 2002 and 2005 elections, it was number 170. In the 2009 election, it was number 169. Since 2013, it has been number 168.

Originally, the constituency comprised the independent city of Kassel and the Landkreis Kassel district. In the 1965 and 1969 elections, it comprised the city of Kassel and the municipalities of Frommershausen, Heckershausen, Ihringshausen, Knickhagen, Mönchehof, Niedervellmar, Obervellmar, Rothwesten, Simmershausen, Wahnhausen, Ahnatal-Weimar, and Wilhelmshausen from Landkreis Kassel. In the 1972 through 1998 elections, it comprised the city of Kassel and the municipalities of Ahnatal, Espenau, Fuldatal, and Vellmar from Landkreis Kassel. It acquired its current borders in the 2002 election.

Members
The constituency has been held continuously by the Social Democratic Party (SPD) since its creation. It was first represented by Georg-August Zinn from 1949 until his resignation in 1951 to become Minister-President of Hesse. He was succeeded by Ludwig Preller after a by-election. Holger Börner was elected in 1957 and served until 1976, when he resigned to become Minister-President of Hesse. Horst Peter was then representative from 1980 to 1994. Gerhard Rübenkönig was elected in 1994 and served until 2005. Former Minister-President of Hesse Hans Eichel then served a single term, before being succeeded by Ulrike Gottschalck in 2009. She was representative until 2017. Timon Gremmels was elected in the 2017 election and re-elected in 2021.

Election results

2021 election

2017 election

2013 election

2009 election

Notes

References

Federal electoral districts in Hesse
1949 establishments in West Germany
Constituencies established in 1949
Kassel
Kassel (district)